Yusuf Mire Mohamed also known as Boos is a Somali politician, who serves as the Minister of Youth and Sports of Somaliland.

See also

 Somaliland Regional Games
 Somaliland Football Association
 Somaliland national football team
 List of Somaliland politicians

References

People from Hargeisa
Peace, Unity, and Development Party politicians
Youth and Sports ministers of Somaliland
Living people
Government ministers of Somaliland
Year of birth missing (living people)